Whistle Down the Wind may refer to:

Literature 
 Whistle Down the Wind (novel), a 1959 novella by Mary Hayley Bell

Film 
 Whistle Down the Wind (film), a 1961 British film adaptation of the 1959 novel of the same name, directed by Bryan Forbes

Musicals 
 Whistle Down the Wind (1989 musical), an adaptation by Richard Taylor and Russell Labey, based on the novel and film of the same name
 Whistle Down the Wind (1996 musical), an adaptation by Andrew Lloyd Webber, based on the film of the same name

Music 
 "Whistle Down the Wind" (Nick Heyward song), 1983
 "Whistle Down the Wind", a 1992 song by Tom Waits from Bone Machine
 Whistle Down the Wind (album), a 2018 album by Joan Baez named after its first track, a cover of Tom Waits' song